Charlesville is an unincorporated community in Bedford County, Pennsylvania, United States.

Notes

Unincorporated communities in Bedford County, Pennsylvania
Unincorporated communities in Pennsylvania